Sayida Ounissi (born 3 February 1987) is a Tunisian politician representing the party of Ennahdha. She currently serves as Secretary of State for Vocational Training.

Early life and education
Ounissi was born in Tunis on 3 February 1987. She has one sister and three brothers. Her father was an Islamist imam, and left Tunisia in 1993 to escape President Zine El Abidine Ben Ali's regime. The family were smuggled to Algeria before joining him in France.

Ounissi attended the Petet Val secondary school in Sucy-en-Brie in Paris. She graduated from the Sorbonne University with a degree in history and political science in 2008 and with a master's degree in economic and social development in 2011. She began doctoral studies in political science in 2011. Her thesis title is "The implementation of social policies and the coercive role of the state."

Career
Ounissi returned to Tunisia in 2011 after the fall of Ben Ali, working as an intern at the African Development Bank. She was a researcher at the Research Institute on Contemporary Maghreb from 2012 to 2014. She was also active in a public policy analysis centre called the Jasmine Foundation. She served as Vice President of the European NGO Young Muslims of Europe.

Ounissi was elected to the Assembly of the Representatives of the People on 26 October 2014 as a member of the Ennahdha representing the constituency of France Nord, an overseas constituency for members of the Tunisian diaspora in France. She was the youngest Ennahda candidate and became one of the youngest members of parliament. She sat on the Committees of Finance, Planning and Development and of Martyrs and Wounded of the Revolution. During the Bardo National Museum attack on 18 March 2015, she was tweeting live updates detailing the panic and evacuation.

On 20 August 2016, Ounissi was appointed to the Executive Board as Secretary of State for Vocational Training in charge of private initiative in the coalition government of Prime Minister Youssef Chahed and as international spokesperson.

Personal life
Ounissi is an Islamist and wears a hijab. She also considers herself a feminist. She attended the El-Fath mosque until the Salafists took possession of it. She is fluent in both English and French. She became engaged to marry in August 2016.

Publications

References

External links
 Ennahdha biography 
 

1987 births
Living people
Tunisian Muslims
Government ministers of Tunisia
Ennahda politicians
Tunisian feminists
Members of the Assembly of the Representatives of the People
University of Paris alumni
People from Tunis
Women government ministers of Tunisia
21st-century Tunisian women politicians
21st-century Tunisian politicians